The grammar of the Manx language has much in common with related Indo-European languages, such as nouns that display gender, number and case and verbs that take endings or employ auxiliaries to show tense, person or number. Other morphological features are typical of Insular Celtic languages but atypical of other Indo-European languages. These include initial consonant mutation, inflected prepositions and verb–subject–object word order.

Nouns

Gender 
Manx nouns fall into one of two genders, masculine or feminine.
 
Masculine is considered the "default" or "unmarked" gender.
 

Number 
Nouns show singular and plural number in Manx.

Case

Nominative 
The base form of a noun is in the nominative case, e.g.  "friend",  "friends".

Vocative 
A nominative noun is lenited to become vocative, e.g. "friend!",  "friends!".

Genitive 
"of a year",  "of a foot". Historical genitive singulars often survive in compounds and fixed expressions although no longer productive, such as  "cowhouse" using the old genitive of  "cattle" or  "the crown", literally "the top of the head", employing lenited  "of a head". "of sheep" is the only distinct genitive plural, the nominative plural being .

Dative 
The dative case is encountered only in set expressions such as  "on foot", where  is the lenited dative  "foot" (nominative:  "foot").

Articles 
In common with the other Insular Celtic languages except Breton, Manx has a definite article but no indefinite article. The definite article takes the form  before masculine nominative and genitive and feminine nominative nouns. This  is often reduced to  before consonants or to  after grammatical words ending in a vowel.

Adjectives

Number 
In earlier versions of the language, these were used attributively, but are little employed in modern Manx.

Degree of comparison 
"terrible" becomes , resulting in  "more terrible" and  "most terrible". The superlative is often shown by the word , from Middle Irish  "thing that is" (cf. Modern Irish , past ). A number of adjectives form their comparative/superlative irregularly.

The comparative/superlative can also be formed using  "more" with the positive form, e.g.  = .

Verbs

Regular verbs 
Manx verbs generally form their finite forms by means of periphrasis: inflected forms of the auxiliary verbs  "to be" or  "to do" are combined with the verbal noun of the main verb. Only the future, conditional, preterite and imperative can be formed directly by inflecting the main verb, but even in these tenses, the periphrastic formation is more common in Late Spoken Manx. An example using the forms of  "throwing" is as follows.
 

 
The future and conditional tenses (and in some irregular verbs, the preterite) make a distinction between "independent" and "dependent" forms. Independent forms are used when the verb is not preceded by any particle; dependent forms are used when a particle (e.g. "not") does precede the verb.
 
The fully inflected forms of the regular verb  "throwing" are as follows. In addition to the forms below, a past participle may be formed using :  "thrown".

 First person singular, making the use of a following subject pronoun redundant
 
First person plural, making the use of a following subject pronoun redundant
 
 Used with all other persons, meaning an accompanying subject must be stated, e.g.  "he will throw",  "they will throw"
 
Below is the conjugation of  "to grow".

 may also be spelt  when pronounced   i.e. before a slender vowel, e.g.
 
These peculiarities extend to verbs beginning with f, e.g.  "to leave".

Again,  may also be spelt  where appropriate.

Irregular verbs 
A number of verbs are irregular in their inflection.

Future relative: 
 
Future relative: 
 
The most common and most irregular verb in Manx is  "to be", often used as an auxiliary verb. In addition to the usual inflected tenses,  also has a present tense. The full conjugation of  "to be" is as follows.

Adverbs 
Manx adverbs can be formed from adjectives by means of the word  (from Middle Irish  "with, until"), e.g.  "good" to  "well",  "cheerful" to  "cheerfully". This  is not used when preceded by such words as  "too" and  "very" or followed by  "enough", e.g.  "very good, very well",  "cheerful(ly) enough". The prepositional phrase for "home(wards)" is formed with  "to" and the noun  "place, town, homestead" to give , while the noun  "house, home" can be used unchanged as an adverb to convey the same meaning.

Adverbs of location and motion 
In common with its Goidelic sister languages, Manx has a number of adverbs corresponding to English "up" and "down", the meaning of which depend upon such things as motion or lack thereof and starting point in relation to the speaker.

 
Examples of practical usage are  "There's a man down the street" and  "I'm going down the street",  "Climb up (towards me)" and  "Climb up (away from me)".
 
Likewise, Manx possesses various other single words that distinguish between stationary location and direction or movement towards or away from the speaker, e.g.  "to the east, eastwards" and  "from the east",  "in, inside" (location) and  "in, inside" (direction),  "this side, here",  "from this side, to the other side" and  "over to this side, over to the other side".

Pronouns

Personal 
Technically, Manx has a T-V distinction where the second person singular pronoun  is used to show familiarity while the second person plural  is used as a respectful singular as well as with plural referents. Because of the solidarity of the small speech community, however, Manx speakers would automatically use  when addressing another individual Manx speaker.
 
In common with Irish and Scottish Gaelic, in addition to its regular personal pronouns, Manx has also a series used for emphasis. Under certain phonological circumstances, these can be used as unemphatic pronouns, e.g.
 

 
"myself",  "yourself".

Interrogative 
Manx interrogative pronouns include  "who?",  "what?" and  "what?".

Indefinite 
"whoever, anyone".  is used like English "some-", e.g. "someone" (with  "person").

Determiners

Possessive 
A gender distinction is made in the third person singular by means of lenition following masculine  "his, its" and lack of lenition after feminine  "her, its".

 
An alternative  to using the possessive pronouns is to precede a noun with the definite article and follow it with the inflected form of  "at" to show the person, e.g.  "my house" (literally "the house at me") instead of  "my house". This is especially useful in the plural, where all persons share one possessive pronoun, e.g.  "their house", as opposed to  "our/your/their house".
 
Possessive determiners are used to indicate the object of a verbnoun, e.e. "He sees him",  "He sees her",  "He sees us/you/them".

Prepositions 
Like the other Insular Celtic languages, Manx has so-called inflected prepositions, contractions of a preposition with a pronominal direct object, as the following common prepositions show. Note the sometimes identical form of the uninflected preposition and its third person singular masculine inflected form.
 

 is the usual word today.  is literary. This is also the inflection of  "to".
 
 "of her" is distinguished from homophonous  "to her" in spelling by means of an apostrophe.
 
, .
 
 is equivalent to various different prepositions in English depending on context, e.g.  "listen to",  "fight against",  " for a while".
 
The spelling  distinguishes it from the homophonic noun  "king".
 
In addition to the above "simple" prepositions, Manx has a number of prepositional phrases based on a noun; being based on nouns, the possessive personal pronouns are used to refer to what would in English be pronominal prepositional objects. This also happens in English phrases such as "for my sake".
 

 
Alternative conjugation patterns are sometimes found with these more complex prepositions using inflected prepositions, e.g.  for  "concerning me",  "for our sake" instead of  "for our/your/their sake".

Conjunctions 
The main coordinating conjunctions in Manx are  "and",  "but" and  "or". Subordinating conjunctions include  "while",  "until",  "that; so that",  "because",  "although (affirmative/negative)" and  "when".  "if" introduces conditional clauses as do  "as if" and  "unless".

Numbers 
Manx numbers are traditionally vigesimal, as seen below. Some speakers use a more modern decimal version of some numbers, in a similar way to Irish and Scottish Gaelic, for example, to simplify the teaching of arithmetic.

References 

 
Grammar